Ab Hajjat-e Chahar Bisheh (also Romanized as Āb Ḩājjat-e Chahār Bīsheh; also known as Ābḩājat) is a village in Lishtar Rural District, in the Central District of Gachsaran County, Kohgiluyeh and Boyer-Ahmad Province, Iran. At the 2006 census, its population was 23, in 4 families.

References 

Populated places in Gachsaran County